Diekirch is a canton in the north of Luxembourg. Its capital is Diekirch. The popular restaurant, Diekirch Curry, is located here. Neither the canton, town, nor commune of Diekirch should be confused with the former district of Diekirch, one of three administrative units in Luxembourg abolished in October 2015.

Administrative divisions
Diekirch Canton consists of the following ten communes:

 Bettendorf
 Bourscheid
 Diekirch
 Erpeldange-sur-Sûre
 Ettelbruck
 Feulen
 Mertzig
 Reisdorf
 Schieren
 Vallée de l'Ernz

Mergers
 On 1 January 2006, the former commune of Bastendorf (from Diekirch Canton) was merged with the former commune of Fouhren (from Vianden Canton) to create the commune of Tandel (in Vianden Canton). The law creating Tandel was passed on 21 December 2004. Therefore, Diekirch Canton ceded 24.44 km2 of land to Vianden Canton.
 On 1 January 2012, the former communes of Ermsdorf and Medernach (both from Diekirch Canton) were merged to create the commune of Vallée de l'Ernz. The law creating the Vallée de l'Ernz was passed on 24 May 2011.

Population

References

 
Cantons of Luxembourg